Preesall is a civil parish in the Wyre district of Lancashire, England.  It contains six buildings that are recorded in the National Heritage List for England as designated listed buildings.  Of these, one is at Grade II*, the middle grade, and the others are at Grade II, the lowest grade.  The parish includes the villages of Preesall and Knott End-on-Sea and the surrounding countryside.  The listed buildings comprise three houses, a former mill, and a church.


Key

Buildings

References

Citations

Sources

Lists of listed buildings in Lancashire
Buildings and structures in the Borough of Wyre